Macau participated in the 1998 Asian Games held in Bangkok, Thailand from 6 December 1998 to 20 December 1998 for the last time as a Portuguese territory before its transfer of sovereignty to China. Macau won only a single silver medal and finished at 28th position in a medal table.

References

Nations at the 1998 Asian Games
1998
Asian Games